Moonlight in Hawaii is a 1941 American musical film comedy starring Jane Frazee.

Maria Montez has a small role, with her hair dyed blonde.

Plot
Deciding to quit his singing act and become a tourist guide, Pete Fleming escorts wealthy Mrs. Floto and her three nieces to Hawaii for a vacation. Behind his back, Pete's three bandmates stowaway and tag along.

At a resort, bandleader Clipper Conovan can't hire the musicians, but hotel guest Toby Spencer, taking a shine to Pete, introduces him to her father Walter, who runs a pineapple plantation. Walter is involved in a business dispute with his partner, Lawton, and both men vie for Mrs. Floto's attentions as well.

Toby falls for Pete, who discovers she can sing and wants her to be a part of the band's new act. But one of Mrs. Floto's nieces also wants to sing, and exotic entertainer Ilani catches everyone's eye, too. Toby and Pete ultimately form a partnership, professionally and romantically, while Mrs. Floto, unable to decide between the two pineapple growers, surprises both by deciding to marry Clipper the bandleader.

Cast
Johnny Downs ...  Pete
Jane Frazee ...  Toby
Leon Errol ...  Spencer
Mischa Auer ...  Clipper
Charles Coleman ...  Butler
Sunnie O'Dea ...  Gloria
Marjorie Gateson ...  Aunt Effie Floto
Richard Carle ...  Lawton
Maria Montez ...  Ilani
Janet Warren ...  Doris (as Elaine Morey)
Judd McMichael ...  Ollie Barrett
Ted McMichael...  Red Simpson
Joe McMichael ...  Beans Smith
Mary Lou Cook ...  Mary Lou

References

External links
 
Moonlight in Hawaii at TCMDB

1941 films
American black-and-white films
1941 musical comedy films
Universal Pictures films
American musical comedy films
1940s English-language films
1940s American films